Joseph Paul Amoah (born 12 January 1997) is a Ghanaian sprinter specializing in the 100 metres and the 200 metres. He competed at the 2019 World Athletics Championships in the 100 metres and 4 × 100 metres relay, and at the 2019 African Games he won a gold medal in the 4 × 100 metres relay. He was also a 100 metres finalist at the 2019 African Games, finishing fourth.

Amoah has personal best times of 9.94 seconds and 20.08 seconds in the 100 metres and 200 metres respectively. His personal best performance in the 200 metres broke the Ghanaian record previously held by three-time Olympian Emmanuel Tuffour by 0.07 seconds.

Early life
Amoah was born on 12 January 1997 to Thomas Amoah and Alberta Antwi in Greater Accra, Ghana, and was raised by his uncle Dr. Victor Antwi from middle school onwards. His preferred sport growing up was football, but transitioned to athletics while attending Prempeh College in Kumasi where his running talent was discovered. As a 19-year old he emerged as an Olympic hopeful for Ghana in the sprints after running 100 metres in 10.08 seconds at the 2016 Ghana's Fastest Human competition.

University
After his prep career at Prempeh College, he decided to quit athletics when enrolling into Kwame Nkrumah University of Science and Technology (KNUST). However the head coach of athletics at KNUST had heard of Amoah's talent while at Prempeh college and convinced Amoah to join the team with the help of his uncle. In 2017 he transferred to Coppin State University in Baltimore, which competes in Division I of the National Collegiate Athletic Association (NCAA), the highest level of intercollegiate athletics in the United States.

At the 2019 Mid-Eastern Athletic Conference Championships in May, Amoah became the first Ghanaian in any sport to qualify for the 2020 Summer Olympics by running 200 metres in a personal best time in 20.20 seconds. It was the fastest performance from a Ghanaian since 1995 and also qualified him for the 2019 World Athletics Championships. Later in June of that season at the NCAA Division I Championships, he improved his personal best times in the 100 metres and 200 metres to 10.01 seconds and 20.08 seconds respectively. He broke three-time Olympian Emmanuel Tuffour's 24-year old Ghanaian record in the 200 metres (20.15 seconds, set at altitude), and qualified for the 2020 Summer Olympics in the 100 metres.

2021 World Relays
Amoah was selected to represent Ghana at the 2021 World Relays on 1–2 May in Poland, which served as a qualifier for the 2021 Olympic Games and the 2022 World Championships for Ghana. In the final Amoah anchored Ghana to bronze with a time of 39.11 seconds, but the team was disqualified after footage review showed Amoah receiving the baton beyond the passing zone from teammate Joseph Oduro Manu. However, because they qualified for the final with a time of 38.79 seconds in the semi finals, Ghana with Amoah still qualified to compete at the Olympic Games.

Career 
Joseph Paul ran under 10 seconds for the first time on April 23rd 2022 with a time of 9.94 seconds, making him the 4th Ghanaian to run the event under 10 seconds. The time also marked the first time in Ghana's history where two of their athletes made the top 2 in the world for the 100m.

Achievements

International championships

National championships

NCAA results from Track & Field Results Reporting System profile.

References

External links

 (Track & Field Results Reporting System)

Ghanaian male sprinters
1997 births
Living people
People from Greater Accra Region
World Athletics Championships athletes for Ghana
Athletes (track and field) at the 2019 African Games
African Games medalists in athletics (track and field)
Coppin State University alumni
Prempeh College alumni
African Games gold medalists for Ghana
Athletes (track and field) at the 2018 Commonwealth Games
Commonwealth Games competitors for Ghana
Athletes (track and field) at the 2020 Summer Olympics
Olympic athletes of Ghana
Coppin State Eagles men's track and field athletes
Commonwealth Games bronze medallists for Ghana
Commonwealth Games medallists in athletics
Athletes (track and field) at the 2022 Commonwealth Games
Medallists at the 2022 Commonwealth Games